Frestelse (Temptation) is a Swedish black-and-white drama film from 1940. It was directed by Arne Bornebusch. The screenplay was written by Torsten Lundqvist and Bornebusch.

Production and release
The film was shot in 1939 at Europa Studio in Sundbyberg, Stockholm, and Norway. The film was released as Ingeborg Lien in Norway and as Suurkaupungin leikkikalu (Big City Plaything) in Finland.

Plot
The young Norwegian fisherman's daughter Ingeborg Lien, who lives in a remote fishing village, dreams of success and the big city. She gets there and wins a beauty pageant. Ingeborg is attended to by two men, who have no other purpose than to enjoy her as a young and charming mistress for a while. When Ingeborg realizes this, she turns to a newly acquired female friend. During a police raid in a sinister gambling den, she manages to escape and is rescued by the taxi driver and engineering student Gustav Lind. He takes care of Ingeborg without asking for anything in return. Gustav also gets her a place as a nanny with his boss, but one day the police find her there. He buys a train ticket for Ingeborg so that she can travel back to the fishing village. She does not return home, but instead tries to drown herself. Ingeborg is saved in the end. She now understands what luxury and external appearances are worth, and she confidently looks forward to a different life together with Gustav.

Cast

Sonja Wigert as Ingeborg Lien 
Åke Ohberg as Rolf Arming 
Karl-Arne Holmsten as Gustav Lind 
Ullastina Rettig as Marianne 
Ludde Juberg as Lambert Ljunggren 
Gunnar Simenstad as Ole Arntsen 
Rune Carlsten as Tage Wickman 
Wera Lindby as Lillan 
George Thunstedt as Krister Strand 
Eric Gustafson as Set Wormgardt 
Tryggve Larssen as Jonas Lien 
Aagot Børseth as Asbjørg Lien 
Artur Rolén as the croupier 
Viran Rydkvist as the landlady
Gösta Grip as the friend

References

External links
 
 Frestelse at Filmfront
 Frestelse at the Swedish Film Database

1940 films
Swedish drama films
Swedish black-and-white films
1940s Swedish-language films
1940s Swedish films